Igor Sergeyevich Makarov (born September 19, 1987) is a professional ice hockey player who is currently an unrestricted free agent. He most recently played with HC Sibir Novosibirsk in the Kontinental Hockey League (KHL). Makarov was selected 33rd overall in the second round of the 2006 NHL Entry Draft by the Chicago Blackhawks.

Playing career
He spent two seasons in the KHL before being signed to a two-year contract by the Chicago Blackhawks in 2010. After one season with American Hockey League affiliate, the Rockford IceHogs, in August 2011, Makarov signed a three-year deal to return with SKA Saint Petersburg. On November 27, 2014, Makarov was traded by SKA to HC Neftekhimik Nizhnekamsk in exchange for a fifth-round pick in 2015.

After two seasons with Salavat Yulaev Ufa, Makarov left as a free agent and returned for a second stint with Dynamo Moscow for the 2018–19 season on September 27, 2018.

Personal
He is the son of Sergei Makarov, who played eight seasons with Krylya Sovetov Moscow during the 1980s.

Career statistics

Regular season and playoffs

International

References

External links

RussianProspects.com Igor Makarov profile

1987 births
Living people
Avangard Omsk players
Chicago Blackhawks draft picks
HC CSKA Moscow players
HC Dynamo Moscow players
Krylya Sovetov Moscow players
HC Neftekhimik Nizhnekamsk players
Rockford IceHogs (AHL) players
Russian ice hockey right wingers
Salavat Yulaev Ufa players
HC Sibir Novosibirsk players
SKA Saint Petersburg players